The Central Photographic Establishment (CPE) is a former Royal Air Force unit that dealt with Photographic reconnaissance after the Second World War. It started life as No. 106 (Photographic Reconnaissance) Wing RAF on 3 July 1943. The wing was upgraded to a group on 14 April 1944 as No. 106 (Photographic Reconnaissance) Group RAF under RAF Coastal Command then on 15 August 1946 it was upgraded again to the CPE.

History

The CPE was formed on 15 August 1946 at Fifield House, Benson.

History of No. 106 (Photographic Reconnaissance) Wing RAF

106 Wing was formed on 3 July 1943 at RAF Benson.

History of No. 106 (Photographic Reconnaissance) Group RAF

106 Group was formed on 14 April 1944 at Fifield House, Benson.

See also
 RAF Medmenham, the main interpretation centre for photographic reconnaissance operations
 List of Royal Air Force units & establishments

References

Citations

Bibliography

Military units and formations of the Royal Air Force